Greggory Walker (born December 1, 1963, in Columbus, Indiana) is a Republican member of the Indiana State Senate representing the 41st district.  He was first elected in 2006. He defeated the incumbent State Senator and President pro tempore of the Indiana Senate, Robert Dean Garton, in the Republican Primary. Walker serves as the Chair of the Senate Committee on Elections and ranking member of the Senate Committee on Family and Children Services and the Senate Committee on Insurance and Financial Institutions. He also serves on the Senate Committee on  Pensions and Labor, the Senate Committee on Tax and Fiscal Policy, and the Senate Committee on Ethics. Walker is a consultant with Proffer Brainchild Analytics. He is also an elder at the Church of Christ in Columbus.Walker holds a Bachelor of Arts degree in business finance from Indiana University and a Master of Business Administration degree from Indiana Wesleyan University. He lives in Columbus with his wife, Allison, and their four children Michaela, Andrew, Hannah and Rebecca.

References

External links
State Senator Greg Walker official Indiana State Legislature site
 

1963 births
Republican Party Indiana state senators
Living people
People from Columbus, Indiana
21st-century American politicians